Joseph Louis Bernardin (April 2, 1928 – November 14, 1996) was an American Cardinal of the Catholic Church. He served as Archbishop of Cincinnati from 1972 until 1982, and as Archbishop of Chicago from 1982 until his death in 1996 from pancreatic cancer. Bernardin was elevated to the cardinalate in 1983 by Pope John Paul II.

Biography
Joseph Bernardin was born on April 2, 1928, in Columbia, South Carolina, to Joseph Bernardin and Maria Maddalena Simion, an Austro-Hungarian born immigrant couple, from the village of Fiera di Primiero, now located in the Northern Italian region of Trentino. He was baptized and confirmed at St. Peter's Catholic Church in Columbia. His father died of cancer when Bernardin was six. He took responsibility for his younger sister, Elaine, while his widowed mother worked as a seamstress.

Bernardin's original academic ambition was to become a physician, inspiring him to enroll in the pre-medical program at the University of South Carolina.  He then transferred to Saint Mary Seminary in Baltimore, Maryland. He graduated with a Bachelor of Arts degree in Philosophy in 1948, and subsequently enrolled in The Catholic University of America to complete his theological studies.

On April 26, 1952, Bernardin was ordained a priest of the Diocese of Charleston by John J. Russell at St. Joseph Church. This diocese covers the entire state of South Carolina. During his 14-year tenure at the Diocese of Charleston, Father Bernardin served under four bishops in capacities including chancellor, vicar general, diocesan counselor, and, when the See was vacant, diocesan administrator. In 1959, Pope John XXIII named Bernardin a Papal Chamberlain with the title Very Reverend Monsignor.

Auxiliary Bishop of Atlanta
On March 9, 1966 Pope Paul VI appointed Bernardin titular Bishop of Liguria and Auxiliary Bishop of the Archdiocese of Atlanta. His episcopal consecration took place on April 26, 1966 at the hands of his mentor, the Archbishop of Atlanta, Paul Hallinan. Bernardin, only 38 years old, thus became the youngest bishop in America. From 1966 to 1968, Bishop Bernardin served as rector of the Cathedral of Christ the King in Atlanta, Georgia.

According to Monsignor Kenneth Velo, a former executive aide to Bernardin and head of the Catholic Church Extension Society, it was in the predominantly Baptist American South that Bernardin learned ecumenism.

General Secretary of National Conference
In 1968, Bernardin resigned as auxiliary bishop of Atlanta to become the first General Secretary of the National Conference of Catholic Bishops, a post he held until 1972. In 1969 Bernadin was instrumental in founding one of the conference's most influential and successful programs, the anti-poverty Campaign for Human Development (CCHD).

Archbishop of Cincinnati
Pope Paul VI appointed Bernardin Archbishop of Cincinnati on November 21, 1972, and he was installed there on December 19, 1972. Bernardin served the Metropolitan See of Cincinnati for nearly ten years. While there he appointed the first woman editor of the archdiocesan newspaper, The Catholic Telegraph.

While Archbishop of Cincinnati, Bernardin was named to the Sacred Congregation of Bishops, elected to the permanent council of the Synod of Bishops, and was elected president of the National Conference of Catholic Bishops. He worked to improve relations between Catholics and Jews, strove for better understanding between the Catholic Church and Protestant denominations, and made pastoral visits to both Poland and Hungary.

Archbishop of Chicago
Following the death of Cardinal John Cody of Chicago, Pope John Paul II chose Archbishop Bernardin, already prominent among his fellow American bishops, to lead the Archdiocese of Chicago.  He was appointed the twelfth Bishop and seventh Archbishop of Chicago on July 10, 1982. On August 25, 1982, he was formally installed in that role by the Apostolic Delegate, Pio Laghi. Bernardin found an archdiocese in disarray, its priests disheartened by years of arbitrary administration and charges of financial misconduct. "With his patient charm and willingness to listen, Bernardin won back the confidence of the clergy and the laity."

Elevation to Cardinal
In the Consistory of February 2, 1983, he was elevated to the Sacred College of Cardinals by Pope John Paul II as Cardinal-Priest of Gesù Divino Lavoratore (Jesus the Divine Worker) as his titular church.

Honorary degrees and awards
In 1989, Bernardin was awarded the F. Sadlier Dinger Award by educational publisher William H. Sadlier, Inc. The award is presented annually in recognition of an outstanding contribution to the ministry of religious education in America.

In 1983, Bernardin delivered commencement addresses and received honorary degrees at the College of the Holy Cross and Notre Dame. In 1995, Bernardin was granted the University of Notre Dame's highest honor, the Laetare Medal, given in recognition of outstanding service to the Roman Catholic Church and society.

In 1990, Bernardin received the Golden Plate Award of the American Academy of Achievement.

Bernardin was posthumously inducted as a Laureate of The Lincoln Academy of Illinois and awarded the Order of Lincoln (the State's highest honor) by the Governor of Illinois in 1997 in the area of Religion.

Policy regarding clerical abuse

Bernardin implemented a policy concerning priests accused of sexual misconduct with minors. He removed more than 20 priests and established a new review board to assess allegations, made up primarily of lay people. Bernardin's reforms concerning this issue soon served as a model for other dioceses across the nation.

Bernardin said in a press conference that he had been accused of sexual misconduct. Former seminarian Stephen Cook claimed to have been abused by Bernardin and another priest in the 1970s. But, Cook subsequently dropped Bernardin from his lawsuit, being no longer certain that his memories, which had emerged while he was under hypnosis, were accurate. The two later reconciled. In 1995 Cook said that he had relied on people who told him things that were not true, "asserting that he is absolutely convinced of Bernardin's innocence".

Final illness

In June 1995, following a string of international visits and pilgrimages, Bernardin underwent surgery for pancreatic cancer. On August 30, 1996, Bernardin told his flock that the cancer had returned, was in his liver, and was inoperable. He turned over the day-to-day administration of the Archdiocese to his vicar general and auxiliary bishop, Raymond Goedert. Bernardin then began to focus much of his ministry on the sick, and became the "unofficial chaplain" to Chicago cancer patients.

On September 23, Bernardin traveled to Rome to visit with Pope John Paul II and visit Assisi. It was on that trip that Bernardin made his funerary arrangements. Upon his return to Chicago, he arranged for the care for his mother, whom he visited daily at her nursing home, and the distribution of his personal possessions. Bernardin arranged for his personal papers and administrative files to be transported from the Residence and Pastoral Center to the Archdiocese of Chicago's Archives and Records Center.

Two weeks before his death, he completed a book about the end of life and about his own approaching death in particular, called The Gift Of Peace, with the help of his friend and biographer Eugene Kennedy.

In his final weeks, he was also awarded the Presidential Medal of Freedom by President Bill Clinton. He gave a major address, "Seamless Garment of Life", at Georgetown University, where he received an award from and conversed with Father Leo J. O'Donovan, S.J., then Georgetown's president.

He said goodbye to 800 of the diocesan and religious clergy of the Archdiocese at Holy Name Cathedral weeks before his death. On October 7, Bernardin met with the Presbyterate, and by the end of October, he withdrew from active ministry due to his deteriorating strength. In his last days, Bernardin wrote to the United States Supreme Court against assisted suicide.

On November 14, 1996, Bernardin died from pancreatic cancer at the age of 68.

The funeral homily was given by his friend Reverend Monsignor Kenneth Velo. In the weeks before his death, Bernardin emphasized to the faithful and the public that he was at peace because of his life's profound reliance on God's sustaining grace in his ministry and his struggles with cancer, seeing death as "a continuation and a friend to prepare properly for by conducting ourselves well and letting go to abandon one's self to God in the end". He was interred in the Bishops' Mausoleum at Mt. Carmel Cemetery, Hillside, Illinois, following a Funeral Mass celebrated by his friend, Cardinal Roger Mahony, and a wake for priests at which his friend Father Scott Donahue spoke.

Views

Social issues
In 1981, Bernardin became head of the new NCCB Ad Hoc Committee on War and Peace, formed to draft a pastoral letter on nuclear proliferation. The resulting book-length letter, "The Challenge of Peace: God's Promise and Our Response", was published in 1983. An influential statement of Catholic social teaching, the document condemns nuclear warfare and states that nuclear deterrence is "not an adequate strategy as a long-term basis for peace; it is a transitional strategy justifiable only in conjunction with resolute determination to pursue arms control and disarmament". In relation to his work on the nuclear question, Bernardin was featured on the front cover of a 1982 issue of Time Magazine entitled "God and the Bomb".

Bernardin became a mediator between the diverging parties in the changing Post-Conciliar Church. In 1996, Bernardin inaugurated the Catholic Common Ground Initiative and was among the authors of its founding document "Called to Be Catholic: Church in a Time of Peril," released August 12, 1996.

Bernardin is also noted for his interest in the concern of young adults, which was in part evidenced by his involvement in the nascent Theology on Tap lecture movement in the early 1980s. In 1985, he told attendees of a special Theology on Tap Mass, "If I had children of my own, they would be your age. You are very special to me and to this Archdiocese."

The Windy City Gay Chorus performed at Bernardin's funeral, reportedly at his request.

In 1985, Bernadin established an AIDS task force to determine how the Archdiocese might best care for those stricken by the AIDS crisis. In 1989, he dedicated Bonaventure House with the help of the Alexian Brothers, a residential facility for people suffering with AIDS. Bernardin was also lauded for his anti-pornography work, his leadership of the U.S. bishops, and the presidency of the Catholic Church Extension Society. In his final years, he relied heavily on the assistance of his adviser Monsignor Kenneth Velo, director of Catholic Extension.

One of his final works was writing a book about his own dying, an excerpt of which served as a Newsweek magazine cover story, and which admirers saw as a lesson in dying.

Interfaith relations
Bernardin promoted ecumenism. While Archbishop of Cincinnati, Bernardin engaged in interfaith dialogue with Jews, Presbyterians, Episcopalians, and Lutherans. In 1984, he began the Council of Religious Leaders of Metropolitan Chicago, the successor group to the Chicago Conference on Religion and Race, and was the council's first president. Under Bernardin, the Archdiocese of Chicago established covenants with the Episcopal Diocese of Chicago in 1986 and with the Metropolitan Synod of the Evangelical Lutheran Church in America in 1989.

Bernardin attended the World Parliament of Religions in Chicago in 1993. In 1995, he led an interfaith pilgrimage to the Holy Land to meet with government and religious leaders in Israel and Palestine and promote peace. Bernardin condemned violence in Lebanon, Israel, and Northern Ireland and called for the Catholic Church to become a "peace church".

Legacy
Bernardin was an influential figure in the Catholic Church in the United States following the Second Vatican Council; George Weigel called him "arguably the most powerful Catholic prelate in American history".

Two Catholic schools in the Archdiocese of Chicago were named after him: the Cardinal Joseph Bernardin School in Orland Hills, Illinois, and the Cardinal Bernardin Early Childhood Center.

Loyola University of Chicago's Cancer Treatment Center is named the "Cardinal Bernardin Cancer Center."

In his hometown of Columbia, South Carolina, at the church of his Baptism and Confirmation, St. Peter's, consecrated the Cardinal Bernadin Center; and the University of South Carolina established the annual "Joseph Cardinal Bernardin Lecture" in 1999. Cardinal Bernardin Way in Chicago is named after him. Catholic Theological Union (CTU) in Chicago is home to the Bernardin Center for Theology and Ministry, which hosts Bernardin's Catholic Common Ground Initiative (CCGI).

The CCHD has established for youth achievers the Cardinal Joseph Bernardin New Leadership Award, given out each year in the United States.

Criticism
Author George Weigel has been a severe critic of Bernardin and his influence in the Catholic Church in the United States. He accused him of creating a "Bernardin Machine" to appoint bishops that dominated the American hierarchy for decades, and also of being the exponent of a "culturally accommodating Catholicism". He deemed the defeat of bishop Gerald Kicanas to then-archbishop Timothy Dolan, for the presidency of the United States Conference of Catholic Bishops, in November 2010, as "the end of Bernardin era".

See also

 Catholic Church in the United States
 Historical list of the Catholic bishops of the United States
 Italians in Chicago
 List of Catholic bishops of the United States
 Lists of patriarchs, archbishops, and bishops

References

Sources
Millies, Steven P.  Joseph Bernardin: Seeking Common Ground, Liturgical Press, 2016.  .
Bernardin, Joseph. The Gift of Peace: Personal Reflection, Doubleday, 1998. .
Wall, A.E.P. The Spirit of Cardinal Bernardin, Thomas More Press, 1983. . Thomas More Press, 1997. .
 
 

1928 births
1996 deaths
20th-century American cardinals
Roman Catholic archbishops of Cincinnati
Roman Catholic archbishops of Chicago
Catholics from South Carolina
University of South Carolina alumni
Catholic University of America alumni
American people of Italian descent
Deaths from pancreatic cancer
People from Chicago
People from Columbia, South Carolina
Roman Catholic Diocese of Charleston
Deaths from cancer in Illinois
Burials at the Bishop's Mausoleum, Mount Carmel Cemetery (Hillside)
Cardinals created by Pope John Paul II
Roman Catholic bishops of Atlanta
Laetare Medal recipients
Religious leaders from South Carolina
Presidential Medal of Freedom recipients
American consistent life ethics activists